Benjamin Huntsman Williams (10 June 1944 – 3 August 1978) was a Rhodesian first-class cricketer.

Williams, a left-arm fast-medium bowler, was a good enough player in his youth to have represented Rhodesian Nuffield, South African Schools and Rhodesia Country Districts by his 18th birthday.

He made his first-class debut in the 1963/64 Currie Cup season, playing for Orange Free State against North Eastern Transvaal. Despite opening the bowling in each innings, he failed to take a wicket.

In 1966 he appeared for Matabeleland against the touring Australian team, in a non first-class fixture. He took four first innings wickets, Bob Simpson, Bob Cowper, Ian Redpath and Keith Stackpole. This earned him a call up to the Rhodesian side to take on the same opponent and he made two further first-class appearances in the 1966/67 Currie Cup competition. He didn't play again for Rhodesia until the 1969/70 Currie Cup, when he took part in four matches.

When not playing cricket, Williams worked as a farmer, in Inyati. On 3 August 1978, while on duty as a police reserve, he was fatally wounded in the arm by a rocket-propelled grenade fired at his vehicle by Bush War guerrillas during an ambush. He died of wounds later that day.

References

1944 births
Cricketers from Bulawayo
Rhodesia cricketers
Free State cricketers
White Rhodesian people
Zimbabwean people of British descent
Rhodesian military personnel killed in action
Rhodesian military personnel of the Bush War
1978 deaths